Only the Wind Knows the Answer is a 1974 West German-French thriller film directed by Alfred Vohrer and starring Maurice Ronet, Marthe Keller and Karin Dor. It was entered into the 9th Moscow International Film Festival. Location shooting took place on the French Riviera, Zurich, Frankfurt and Munich.

Plot
A millionaire and his crew are killed when his yacht explodes. An insurance detective investigates and realises soon that there is more behind the spectacular accident than meets the eye.

Cast
 Maurice Ronet as Robert Lucas
 Marthe Keller as Angela Delpierre
 Raymond Pellegrin as Inspector Lacrosse
 Karin Dor as Nicole Monnier
 André Falcon as Mr. Ribeyrolles
 Anton Diffring as John Keelwood
 Robert Dalban as the Chief Inspector
 Christian Barbier as Inspector Dupin
 Philippe Baronnet as Alain
 Walter Kohut as Heinz Seeberg
 Charlotte Kerr as Hilde Hellmann
 Eva Pflug as Karin Lucas
 Herbert Fleischmann as Gustav Brandenburg
 Klaus Schwarzkopf
 Heinz Baumann
 Konrad Georg

References

External links
 

1974 films
1970s thriller films
1970s German-language films
West German films
German thriller films
French thriller films
Films directed by Alfred Vohrer
Films based on Austrian novels
Films set on the French Riviera
Films set in the Mediterranean Sea
Constantin Film films
1970s French films
1970s German films